Allan Haggo (born 30 November 1961) is a cricket umpire from Scotland. In 2015, he was inducted into the ICC Associates and Affiliates Umpire Panel along with Ian Ramage, another Scottish umpire.

On 14 August 2016 he stood in his first One Day International match, when he was one of the umpires for the fixture between Scotland and the United Arab Emirates at The Grange Club, Edinburgh in the 2015–17 ICC World Cricket League Championship. On 12 June 2018, he stood in his first Twenty20 International (T20I) match, between Scotland and Pakistan.

In April 2019, he was named as one of the eight on-field umpires for the 2019 ICC World Cricket League Division Two tournament in Namibia. In January 2022, he was named as one of the on-field umpires for the 2022 ICC Under-19 Cricket World Cup in the West Indies.

See also
 List of One Day International cricket umpires
 List of Twenty20 International cricket umpires

References

1961 births
Living people
Sportspeople from Irvine, North Ayrshire
Scottish cricket umpires
Scottish One Day International cricket umpires
Scottish Twenty20 International cricket umpires